Larva is a 2005 American science fiction horror television film directed by Tim Cox. The screenplay by J. Paul V. Robert, T.M. Van Ostrand, David Goodin, and Kevin Moore is from a story by Kenneth M. Badish and Boaz Davidson. The film stars Vincent Ventresca, Rachel Hunter, David Selby, and William Forsythe.

Plot
The film taking place in Host, Missouri about a species of fluke-like parasites that have been mutated after ingesting enhanced cow feed. They infect animals (including humans) from the inside and grow at an enormous rate, bursting out of their hosts when they became adults. They go on a rampage, eating anything in their way until they were all killed in a massive explosion.

Cast
 Vincent Ventresca as Eli Rudkus
 Rachel Hunter as Hayley Anderson
 William Forsythe as Jacob Long
 David Selby as Fletcher Odermatt
 Robert Miano as Sheriff Lester
 James Daris as Kenneth Anderson
 James Sheldon as Johnny
 Zachary Stevens as Ted
 Amanda Ianelli as Shelly
 Jessica Summers as Veronica
 Holly McWilliams as Madeline
 Sean Kissner as Milo Turner
 David E. Ornston as Dr. Cummings
 Erron Jay as Deputy
 Sarah Ann Schultz as Barbara
 Kyle Dick as Christopher
 Brandi Prine as Emily
 Johnathon Prine as Jason
 George Cron as The Mortician
 Aimée Flaherty as Nurse
 Nicholas J. Coleman as Patrick
 Carolyn Woodworth as Sally
 John Dickson as Tom Ridgeway
 Jennifer Lyn Quackenbush as News Reporter

Production
The film was shot in Missouri in the city of Springfield, Missouri.

Soundtrack
Texas music producer John Dickson composed the score.

References

External links
 

2005 films
2005 horror films
2005 science fiction films
2005 television films
2000s horror thriller films
2000s monster movies
2000s science fiction horror films
American horror thriller films
American horror television films
American monster movies
American science fiction horror films
American science fiction television films
Films set in Missouri
Films shot in Missouri
Nu Image films
Syfy original films
2000s English-language films
Films directed by Tim Cox
Films produced by Boaz Davidson
Fiction about parasites
Films with screenplays by Boaz Davidson
2000s American films